Sialin, also known as H(+)/nitrate cotransporter and H(+)/sialic acid cotransporter, is a protein which in humans is encoded by the SLC17A5 gene.

Clinical significance 

A deficiency of this protein causes Salla disease. and Infantile Sialic Acid Storage Disease (ISSD).

The gene for HP59 contains, entirely within its coding region, the Sialin Gene SLC17A5. Member 5, also known as SLC17A5 or sialin is a lysosomal membrane sialic acid transport protein which in humans is encoded by the SLC17A5 gene on Chromosome 6

See also 
 Solute carrier family

References

Further reading 

 
 
 
 
 
 
 
 
 
 
 
 
 
 
 
 

Solute carrier family